Țiganu River may refer to the following rivers in Romania:
 Țiganu, a tributary of the Bâsca in Covasna County
 Țiganu, a tributary of the Ciocadia in Gorj County
 Țiganu, a tributary of the Iaz in Gorj County
 Țiganu, a tributary of the Jieț in Hunedoara County 
 Valea Țiganului, a tributary of the Sădurel in Sibiu County
 Țiganu, a tributary of the Sebeș in Brașov County
 Țiganu, a tributary of the Șușița in Gorj County